Luigi Torelli (9 February 1810 – 14 November  1887) was born in Villa di Tirano, in the Valtellina of Lombardy, at the time part of the Napoleonic Kingdom of Italy.

Being a patriot, he took part in the Five Days of Milan, most noted in driving out the Tyrolian Kaiserjäger from Piazza del Duomo and, together with fellow patriot Scipione Bagaggia, for raising the tri-colour atop the Cathedral.

Torelli was a member of diverse scientific and  economic institutions. In 1860  he was made a Senator and in 1864 became Minister of Agriculture, Industry and Commerce of the Kingdom of Italy.

He died at Tirano in 1887.

Recognition

The  Luigi Torelli fought for Italy in World War 2 and was named after him. The submarine was notable for serving under all three axis powers - Italy until it surrendered, later Germany until it was defeated and then finally Imperial Japan.

Sources

External links
 

1810 births
1887 deaths
People from the Province of Sondrio
Counts of Italy
Members of the Senate of the Kingdom of Sardinia